Antoine Sibierski (born 5 August 1974) is a French former professional footballer who played as a midfielder. He started his career at hometown club Lille OSC, going on to play for AJ Auxerre, Nantes, with whom he won the Coupe de France twice, and RC Lens. He then moved to England and played for Manchester City, Newcastle United, with whom he won the UEFA Intertoto Cup, Wigan Athletic, and Norwich City. At international level, he made three appearances for France at the 1996 Summer Olympics. He is currently sporting director of his former club, RC Lens.

Club career

Early career
Born in Lille, Sibierski began his career at hometown club Lille OSC, where he moved up the ranks and played for four complete seasons in the first team before playing for AJ Auxerre and FC Nantes, where he won the 2000 French Cup, in the final of which Sibierski scored both of Nantes' goals. He then joined RC Lens, and eventually became club captain during his three-year stay.

Manchester City
Sibierski moved to Manchester City for a fee of £700,000 in August 2003, where he scored on his debut against Charlton Athletic.

He was a regular substitute for the team, having started only eighteen of the thirty-three games he participated in, during an all important first season in which he scored seven goals.

The 2005–06 season saw him fighting for a new contract at the club. Early on in the season he won a place up front due to the injury of Andrew Cole but was soon reverted to the bench. Antoine was subsequently released by the club that summer.

Newcastle United
Newcastle United signed Sibierski on 31 August 2006 on a one-year contract, just two hours and twenty minutes before the close of the transfer window.

He scored on his Newcastle debut in the UEFA cup first round tie against Levadia. His league debut for the club came at West Ham United on 17 September, and he scored his first domestic goal for Newcastle on 7 November against Watford in the League Cup. He scored his first league goal for the club in a 1–0 win over Portsmouth. Sibierski then went on to score his second league goal for the Magpies against Reading in a thrilling encounter in which the Magpies went on to win 3–2. His goal scoring form at the start of the season proved many doubters wrong, as Sibierski went on to be a key European figure. In Europe, Sibierski made 7 appearances and scored 4 essential goals against Levadia Tallinn, Fenerbahçe, Celta Vigo and Zulte-Waregem respectively.

He quickly became a Newcastle favourite and an important member of the first team loved by the Newcastle faithful. Due to injuries on Tyneside, including England striker Michael Owen, Sibierski mainly played as a striker, where his partnership with Nigerian Obafemi Martins proved successful. He also played as an attacking midfielder in a 4–5–1 formation. He played a part in an exciting 2–2 draw with Manchester United, later saying he was disappointed not to get on the scoresheet against his former club's main rivals. He scored his first European goal of 2007 with a brilliant individual effort against Zulte-Waregem in the UEFA Cup on 15 February. Sibierski nut-megged a defender, took it round another, took it round the keeper and tapped home the last goal in a 3–1 win.

However, Newcastle were not willing to match Sibierski's wish of a new two-year contract at the club, instead offering just another one-year contract, which he rejected. Sibierski's agent Willie McKay stated that whilst negotiations were still ongoing, it looked increasingly likely that Sibierski would be leaving the club as his contract came to an end, especially with newly appointed manager Sam Allardyce bringing fresh ideas and tactics. Following his season with Newcastle, Sibierski described himself as a Newcastle fan. He is affectionately known among Newcastle United fans as 'Sib The Sexist' in homage to Tyneside's Silver Tongued Cavalier 'Sid The Sexist'.

Wigan Athletic
Sibierski agreed a two-year deal with Wigan Athletic on a free transfer from Newcastle United on 4 June 2007 along with Titus Bramble, who played at Newcastle with Sibierski the previous season but was also released. He scored on his debut in the 2–1 defeat at Everton on 11 August 2007. He followed this up with a second goal for the Latics on his home debut at the JJB Stadium on 15 August against Middlesbrough, and a third for Wigan's third game in a row, completing a 3–0 victory over Sunderland on 18 August. Subsequently, Sibierski suffered several injuries and his form slumped, as Wigan slipped from the top 4 to the relegation zone.

However, on 12 January 2008, Sibierski scored a crucial winner within seconds of coming off the bench against Derby County with a low drive into the bottom left corner of the net from 25 yards out. He then followed this up with another spectacular goal against Chelsea, in the FA Cup.

On 1 September 2008, Sibierski joined Norwich City on loan. He scored what proved to be the winning goal on his debut against Plymouth Argyle on 13 September 2008 from a free-kick. However, after this he made little impact and returned to Wigan in January when his loan ended. He was released by Wigan at the end of the 2008–09 season, after not being offered a new contract.

International career
Sibierski is of Polish descent through his paternal grandfather, who came to France from Poland to work in the mines. He represented France at the 1996 Summer Olympics, making three appearances.

Post-playing career
After finishing his playing career, Sibierski briefly became a football agent with his brother. He is currently the Sporting Director of Ligue 2 club RC Lens.

Personal life
Former Lille teammate Frédéric Dindeleux, who had been his friend since the age of eight, was best man at Sibierski's wedding to Isabelle. The couple had three children together: two daughters and a son. Following the unfortunate passing of his 18-year-old elder daughter Sibylle on 1 February 2010, a charity "Fonds de Dotation Sibylle Sibierski" has been formed in her name with the support of football legends such as Real Madrid manager Zinedine Zidane, former Arsenal captain and Manchester City midfielder Patrick Viera, Chelsea striker Didier Drogba and Kevin Keegan of England and Newcastle and more.

Honours
Nantes
 Coupe de France: 1998–99, 1999–2000
 Trophée des Champions: 1999

Newcastle United
 UEFA Intertoto Cup: 2006

Individual
 Goal of the season for Wigan Athletic: against Chelsea, 26 January 2008

References

External links
 

1974 births
Living people
French people of Polish descent
French footballers
Footballers from Lille
Association football forwards
Olympic footballers of France
Footballers at the 1996 Summer Olympics
Ligue 1 players
Premier League players
English Football League players
Lille OSC players
AJ Auxerre players
FC Nantes players
RC Lens players
Manchester City F.C. players
Newcastle United F.C. players
Wigan Athletic F.C. players
Norwich City F.C. players
French expatriate footballers
French expatriate sportspeople in England
Expatriate footballers in England